Melanocortin 2 receptor accessory protein  is a transmembrane accessory protein that in humans is encoded by the MRAP gene  located in chromosome 21q22.11. Alternate splicing of the MRAP mRNA generates two functionally isoforms MRAP-α and MRAP-β.

MRAP is an accessory protein to a family of five receptors called the melanocortin receptors (MC1-5). It was previously known as fat tissue-specific low molecular weight protein (Falp). MRAP was thought to be involved in adipocytes differentiation.  MRAP assists in the transport of the melanocortin 2 receptor to the cell membrane from the endoplasmic reticulum and assist in the generation of cAMP by the activated receptor. MRAP is also considered essential for the trafficking of MC2 to the cell surface and facilitate the MC2 response to Adrenocorticotropic hormone (ACTH) in the adrenal gland leading to stimulation of glucocorticoid synthesis.

Human MRAP is found mainly in the adrenal gland and adipose tissue. It was also, located in the brain, heart, ovary, testes, and breast.  Genetic variants of MRAP are linked to an autosomal recessive condition called Familial Glucocorticoid Deficiency type 2 (FGD-2).

Structure and functional domains 

The cytogenetic location of MRAP gene is 21q22.11 and is composed of 6 exons that encodes a single-pass transmembrane protein. The protein is made of three domains: a transmembrane domain that is responsible for the attachment of the MRAP molecule in the cell membrane and facilitates the interaction with the receptor. The second domain assists MRAP expression on the cell membrane as well as the expression of MC2. The third and final domain that is near the amino- (N-) terminal enables the homodimerization of MRAP molecules. The N-terminal and the transmembrane domains are highly conserved between species. In contrast, the carboxyl-(C-) terminal is found to be diverging between the MRAP isoforms and also between different species. That said, the whole genome of human MRAP shares lower similarity with mouse Mrap, and that is mainly in the N-terminal and transmembrane domain. 
 
The alternate splicing of the MRAP mRNA generates 4 isoforms: two functional isoforms which are MRAP-α (173 amino acids); MRAP-β (102 amino acids); non-functional isoforms, isoform 3 (113 amino acids); and isoform 4 (172 amino acids). MRAP, and its ortholog MRAP2, is the dual topology where either the C- or the N- terminal is oriented extracellularly. This dual topology feature was revealed using epitope immunoprecipitation and live cell imaging studies. MRAP is partially glycosylated and this is dependent on the N-terminal being facing the luminal surface of the endoplasmic reticulum. This unique feature enables MRAP to form an antiparallel homodimer that is essential for the MRAP interaction with the melanocortin receptors.

The expression of MRAP was found to be regulated by ACTH as well as lipopolysaccharides  and, in rats, is affected by diurnal variation. Phylogenetic studies revealed the existence of MRAP orthologs in different piscine species such as zebrafish and tetrapod and has also been detected in mammals and chicken. MRAP is thought to be originated as a result of R2 genome duplication event.

Cellular activity 
MRAP was found to mainly regulate the surface expression and signalling of MC2. Cell surface ELISA and Immunofluorescence studies showed the co-expression of MC2/MRAP in endoplasmic reticulum (ER) and also on the cell membrane, which indicates that MC2 needs MRAP to reach the cell membrane. In addition to cell trafficking, in vitro studies conducted on HEK293 cell revealed that MRAP enhances MC2 response to ACTH stimulation and the effect of MRAP-β was more pronounced than that of MRAP-α. The activated MC2 activates cAMP production which, in turn, stimulates the protein kinase A (PKA) pathway leading to glucocorticoid synthesis in the adrenal gland. In fat cells, where MC2 is expressed, MRAP was found to facilitate MC2 activated lipolysis and therefore regulating energy expenditure. The transmembrane domain of MRAP mediates MRAP/MC2 interaction, and that suggests an interaction with the transmembrane domain of one of the seven domains of MC2. Once the interaction is established, MRAP uses its tyrosine-rich region to escort MC2 to the cell membrane. However, MRAP needs to be in the antiparallel homodimer status. The MC2/MRAP complex expression on the cell membrane culminates in MRAP assisting MC2 to respond to ACTH stimulation, and that is through the same MRAP tyrosine rich area mentioned earlier.

In addition to regulating MC2 surface expression and signalling, MRAP was found to modulate the function of the other melanocortin receptors. Immunoprecipitation assays reported the interaction of MRAP with MC4and MC5 and had no effect on the surface expression of MC1 and MC3. Unlike MC2, MRAP is not essential for these receptors as they were located on the cell surface in the absence of MRAP1. The interaction between MCs and MRAP was found to reduce the former response to the melanocortin synthetic ligand NDP-MSH

Familial glucocorticoid deficiency (FGD) 
The familial glucocorticoid deficiency occurs as a result of poor adrenal response to ACTH stimulation which leads to glucocorticoid deficiency. The mutations in the MRAP gene caused the congenital disorder familial glucocorticoid deficiency type 2 (FGD-2). FGD-2 is an autosomal recessive disease with early childhood onset of recurrent infections, hypoglycaemia, skin hyperpigmentation, and failure to thrive due to low glucocorticoids levels. If left untreated, it could be fatal. MRAP mutations were found to disable the movement of MC2 to the cell surface of adrenal gland cells; this would make MC2 irresponsive to ACTH stimulation causing a deficiency in glucocorticoids production. The mutations in the MRAP gene were found to be mostly homozygous nonsense or splice-site mutations that caused the truncation of MRAP protein. Few FGD-2 cases were reported to have homozygous missense MRAP gene mutations that led to replacing tyrosine with aspartame at position 59 or the substitution of valine with alanine at position 26. These missense mutations cause a milder form of the disease and a later onset. The mutations in the MRAP gene sequence that cause FGD-2 are considered rare compared to the effect of chronic corticosteroid treatment that leads to adrenal insufficiency disrupting the MC2/MRAP stimulation by ACTH.

The adrenal cortex is made of three zones: zona glomerulosa, zona fasciculata and zona reticularis. The main zone that expresses MC2 and MRAP is the zona fasciculata. Both proteins are also found in the undifferentiated region of the adrenal gland, where there is a small population of adrenal stem cells  The use of MRAP knockout transgenic mice revealed under-developed adrenal gland with loss of the adrenal zonation, which indicates another mechanism for FGD-2.

There is still no profound evidence of the involvement of MRAP in disorders beyond the adrenal gland. However, MC2 lipolytic activity was disturbed in the adipose tissue in the presence of mutated MRAP. Nevertheless, the MRAP mutations that caused FGD-2 did not seem to affect fat metabolism in the affected patients. This might indicate a compensatory mechanism to the loss of MRAP function in adipocytes.

The presence of MRAP in regions with no or low MC2 levels might indicate a role of MRAP beyond MC2 and the other melanocortin receptors. Ongoing studies using transgenic mice and array genotyping could give insight into the physiological processes involving MRAP.

Notes

References